Preston Town Hall is a municipal building in Lancaster Road in Preston, Lancashire, England. The town hall, which is the headquarters of Preston City Council, is a Grade II listed building.

History

The first town hall was a medieval structure built on the south side of the Market Square which collapsed in June 1780. It was replaced by a second town hall which was a brick building built on the same site in 1782 and augmented by a cupola in 1814.

After significant industrial growth in the first half of the 19th century, particularly in relation to the cotton industry, civic leaders decided to procure a third town hall on the same site. The foundation stone for the new building was laid by the mayor, Robert Townley Parker, on 2 September 1862. It was designed by George Gilbert Scott in the Gothic style, built by Cooper and Tullis of Preston at a cost of £69,412  and was officially opened by the Duke of Cambridge on 3 October 1867.

As the responsibilities of the borough council increased, council leaders decided to procure a municipal office building to provide extra office space for council officers and their departments: the site selected was open ground in Lancaster Road between the police station to the north and the Sessions House to the south. The municipal office building, which was designed by Sir Arnold Thornely in the Neoclassical style was completed in 1934. The design involved a symmetrical main frontage with eleven bays facing onto the Lancaster Road with the last three bays at each end slightly projected forward; the central section of five bays, which rose higher than the end sections, featured a doorway with an architrave and a pediment decorated with acroteria; in each of the sections the centre window on the first floor was equipped with a balcony.

As part of a two-day visit to Lancashire, King George VI and Queen Elizabeth attended a lunch hosted by the Lord Lieutenant of Lancashire, Lord Derby, at County Hall before meeting civic leaders at the town hall in March 1945 during the Second World War.

The town hall burnt down on 15 March 1947 and was subsequently demolished and a modern building known as Crystal House was built on the site in 1962. A council chamber was created in the municipal office building which was renamed the Preston Town Hall in 1971. The new town hall continued to be the local seat of government after the enlarged Preston District Council was formed in 1974 and remained its home after the local authority secured city status as Preston City Council in 2002.

References

Government buildings completed in 1934
City and town halls in Lancashire
Grade II listed buildings in Lancashire
Buildings and structures in Preston